The Wellesley Islands, also known as the North Wellesley Islands, is a group of islands off the coast of Far North Queensland, Australia, in the Gulf of Carpentaria. It is a locality within the Shire of Mornington local government area. The traditional owners of the islands are the Lardil people.

Geography 
The Wellesley Islands, also known as the North Wellesley Islands, is located in the Gulf of Carpentaria, on the eastern (Queensland) side of the gulf. The largest island in the group is Mornington Island, with most people living in the town of Gununa. Two small islands in the group, north of Mornington Island, are designated as the Manowar and Rocky Islands Important Bird Area, because of their importance for breeding seabirds, in particular the brown booby and lesser frigatebird. Other islands in the group include (from north to south):
 Moondalbee Island
 Lingnoonganee Island
 Pisonia Island
 Lingeleah Island
 Beahgoo Island
 Jinke Island
 Sydney Island
 Tulburrerr Island
 Denham Island
 Andrew Island

Immediately to the south is a group known as the West Wellesley Islands or Forsyth Islands, and to the south-east of them are the South Wellesley Islands, while the Bountiful Islands lie to the east of Mornington Island. Politically, all 26 islands in these groups are within the local government area of the Shire of Mornington.

Ecologically, they constitute subregion GUP10 of the IBRA-defined Gulf Plains bioregion of Australia.

History 
According to Indigenous lore, possibly mixed with fact, the islands were once part of mainland Australia:

The Lardil people, who prefer to be known as Kunhanaamendaa (meaning people of Kunhanhaa, their name for Mornington Island), are an Aboriginal Australian people and the traditional owners of Mornington Island. The Lardil language (also known as Gununa, Ladil), is spoken on Mornington Island and on the northern Wellesley Islands.

The islands were charted by Matthew Flinders on 6 December 1802, and named by him some years later. He probably did not name them until sometime between 1803 and 1810, when he was in French captivity on Mauritius Island; he devoted that time to working on his charts and journals). Flinders probably named the island group in honour of Richard Wellesley, 1st Marquess Wellesley,  Governor of Madras and Governor-General of Bengal from 1797 to 1805. Wellesley, along with Lord William Bentinck, Governor of Madras, tried to secure Flinders' release. He definitely named the largest island in the group, Mornington Island, after Wellesley, who was also the second Earl of Mornington.

The main town on Mornington Island, Gununa (a Lardil word) was founded in 1914 as Mornington Island Community, and renamed by the Queensland Place Names Board on 16 January 1982.

Mornington Island State School opened on 28 January 1975.

Education 
Mornington Island State School is a government-run primary and secondary school at Lardil Street for boys and girls from early childhood through Year  10.. In 2018, the school had an enrolment of 263 students, with 25 teachers and 14 full- and part-time non-teaching staff (the equivalent of 11 full-time m positions). It includes a special education program.

There are no schools on the island or any nearby areas that  offer education to Year 12 on the island. The only options for those years are enrolling in online distance education courses or going away to boarding school.

See also
 Groote Eylandt

References

IBRA subregions
Islands of Queensland
North West Queensland
Gulf of Carpentaria
Shire of Mornington (Queensland)
Localities in Queensland
Carpentaria tropical savanna